Robert Hunter "Cagey" Kirk (8 August 1909 – 11 July 1970) was a professional ice hockey player.

Early life 
Born in Doagh, Ireland, United Kingdom, but grew up in Winnipeg, Manitoba. Kirk played junior hockey in Manitoba.

Career 
Kirk played for the Elmwood Millionaires and competed in the 1929 Memorial Cup. Kirk made his National Hockey League debut with the New York Rangers in 1938 and played 39 games with the team. He was later a coach for the Flin Flon Bombers and Buffalo Bisons.

Awards and achievements
NWHL First All-Star Team (1936)

External links

References 

1909 births
1970 deaths
Canadian ice hockey right wingers
Canadian people of Ulster-Scottish descent
Elmwood Millionaires players
Irish emigrants to Canada (before 1923)
New York Rangers players
Ice hockey people from Winnipeg